Robustagramma is a genus of flies belonging to the family of the lesser dung flies.

Species
R. acutistylum Marshall & Cui, 2005
R. aequale Marshall & Cui, 2005
R. altifrons Marshall & Cui, 2005
R. angusticauda Marshall & Cui, 2005
R. angustistylum Marshall & Cui, 2005
R. arizonense Marshall & Cui, 2005
R. atratum Marshall & Cui, 2005
R. biangulatum Marshall & Cui, 2005
R. binitidum Marshall & Cui, 2005
R. bolivarense Marshall & Cui, 2005
R. brasilense Marshall & Cui, 2005
R. brevicauda Marshall & Cui, 2005
R. brevicilium Marshall & Cui, 2005
R. crassipalpus Marshall & Cui, 2005
R. crassisaccus Marshall & Cui, 2005
R. cultriforme Marshall & Cui, 2005
R. dilatatum Marshall & Cui, 2005
R. disjunctum Marshall & Cui, 2005
R. flavistylum Marshall & Cui, 2005
R. gigantisclerosum Marshall & Cui, 2005
R. grenadense Marshall & Cui, 2005
R. hebes Marshall & Cui, 2005
R. incurvum Marshall & Cui, 2005
R. kittsense Marshall & Cui, 2005
R. latistylum Marshall & Cui, 2005
R. lingulatum Marshall & Cui, 2005
R. longiseta Marshall & Cui, 2005
R. longistylum Marshall & Cui, 2005
R. luciense Marshall & Cui, 2005
R. macrosternum Marshall & Cui, 2005
R. mayense Marshall & Cui, 2005
R. minutiseta Marshall & Cui, 2005
R. mirabile Marshall & Cui, 2005
R. multiseta Marshall & Cui, 2005
R. nigrivittatum Marshall & Cui, 2005
R. obscuratum Marshall & Cui, 2005
R. obscurifrons Marshall & Cui, 2005
R. oculiculus Marshall & Cui, 2005
R. orthogonium Marshall & Cui, 2005
R. ovipenne (Duda, 1925)
R. pallidistylum Marshall & Cui, 2005
R. paralongiseta Marshall & Cui, 2005
R. parauniseta Marshall & Cui, 2005
R. rarum Marshall & Cui, 2005
R. robustinervus Marshall & Cui, 2005
R. robustum (Spuler, 1925)
R. setilamella Marshall & Cui, 2005
R. setituberosum Marshall & Cui, 2005
R. setosum Marshall & Cui, 2005
R. sinuosum Marshall & Cui, 2005
R. spinatimargo Marshall & Cui, 2005
R. triangulatum Marshall & Cui, 2005
R. uniseta Marshall & Cui, 2005
R. vulgare Marshall & Cui, 2005

References

Sphaeroceridae
Sphaeroceroidea genera
Diptera of North America
Diptera of South America